Steven Mithen,  (born 16 October 1960) is a Professor of Archaeology at the University of Reading. He has written a number of  books, including The Singing Neanderthals and The Prehistory of the Mind: The Cognitive Origins of Art, Religion and Science.

Early life and education
Mithen was born on 16 October 1960. He received a BA in prehistory and archaeology from Sheffield University, a MSc degree in biological computation from York University and a PhD in archaeology from Cambridge University.

Academic career
Mithen began his academic career as a research fellow in archaeology at Trinity Hall, Cambridge from 1987 to 1990. He was additionally a Cambridge University lecturer in archaeology (1989–1991), and then a research associate at the McDonald Institute for Archaeological Research from 1991 to 1992. In 1992, he joined the University of Reading as a lecturer in archaeology. He was promoted to senior lecturer in 1996, made Reader in Early Prehistory in 1998, and has been Professor of Early Prehistory since 2000.

Cognitive fluidity

Cognitive fluidity is a term first popularly applied by Mithen in his book The Prehistory of the Mind, a search for the origins of Art, Religion and Science (1996).

The term cognitive fluidity describes how a modular primate mind has evolved into the modern human mind by combining different ways of processing knowledge and using tools to create a modern civilization. By arriving at original thoughts, which are often highly creative and rely on metaphor and analogy, modern humans differ from archaic humans. As such, cognitive fluidity is a key element of the human attentive consciousness. The term has been principally used to contrast the mind of modern humans, especially those after 50,000 before present, with those of archaic humans such as Neanderthals and Homo erectus. The latter appear to have had a mentality that was originally domain-specific in structure; a series of largely isolated cognitive domains for operating in the social, material, and natural worlds. These are termed “Swiss penknife minds” with a set of special modules of intelligence for specific domains such as the Social, Natural history, Technical and Linguistic. With the advent of modern humans the barriers between these domains appear to have been largely removed in the attentive mode and hence cognition has become less compartmentalised and more fluid. Consciousness is of course attentive and self-reflective, and the role of the modular intelligences in neurological “Default mode” is a topic for current research in self-reflective human consciousness.

Mithen uses an appropriately interdisciplinary approach, combining observations from cognitive science, archaeology, and other fields, in an attempt to offer a plausible description of prehistoric intellectual evolution.

Sexy hand-axe hypothesis 
In 1999, Mithen had proposed, together with the science writer Marek Kohn, the "sexy hand-axe hypothesis." This hypothesis proposes that pressures related to sexual selection could result in men making symmetric hand axes to demonstrate their cognitive and physiological fitness.

Honours
In 2004, Mithen was elected a Fellow of the British Academy (FBA), the United Kingdom's national academy for the humanities and social sciences. He was elected a Fellow of the Society of Antiquaries of Scotland (FSA Scot) in 1993 and a Fellow of the Society of Antiquaries of London (FSA) in 1998.

See also
Behavioral modernity
Evolutionary psychology of religion
Evolutionary origin of religions
Environment and intelligence

Publications

General academic books

Mithen, S. J. (2005) The Singing Neanderthals: The Origins of Music, Language, Mind and Body Cambridge, Massachusetts: Harvard University Press, 2006. Weidenfeld & Nicolson, London  (held in 810 libraries, according to WorldCat)
translated as Los neandertales cantaban rap: los orígenes de la música y el lenguaje Barcelona: Crítica, ©2007. 
translated as 歌うネアンデルタール: 音楽と言語から見るヒトの進化 /Utau neanderutāru: ongaku to gengo kara miru hito no shinka Tōkyō: Hayakawashobō, 2006. 
Mithen, S. J. (2003) After the Ice: a global human history, 20,000-5000 BC. Cambridge, Massachusetts: Harvard University Press, 2004. Weidenfeld & Nicolson, London (held in 903 libraries, according to WorldCat)
translated as Konec doby ledové: dějiny lidstva od r. 20000 do r. 5000 př. Kr.  Praha: BB/art, 2006 
Mithen, S. J. (1999) Problem-solving and the evolution of human culture,  London: Institute for Cultural Research, 1999. 
Mithen, S. J. (1998) Creativity in human evolution and prehistory, London; New York: Routledge, 1998.   (held in 175 libraries)
Mithen, S. J. (1996) The prehistory of the mind: a search for the origins of art, religion, and science,   London: Thames and Hudson, ©1996.  (held in 671 libraries)
Translated as  心の先史時代 /Kokoro no senshi jidai. Tōkyō: Seidosha, 1998. 
Translated as Arqueología de la mente: Orígenes del arte, de la religión y de la ciencia Barcelona: Crítica, ©1998. 
translated as Aklın tarih öncesi Ankara: Dost kitapevi, 1999. 
translated as Η Προϊστορία του Νου, (trans. Dimitris Xygalatas and Nikolas Roubekas), Thessaloniki: Vanias, 2010. .
Mithen, S. J (1990) Thoughtful foragers: a study of prehistoric decision making Cambridge [England]; New York: Cambridge University Press, 1990.  (Held in 276 libraries)

Technical academic books
Mithen, S. J. et al. (2006) The early prehistory of Wadi Faynan, Southern Jordan: excavations at the pre-pottery neolithic A site of WF16 and archaeological survey of Wadis Faynan, Ghuwayr and Al Bustan Oxford: Oxbow, 2006-7. 
Mithen, S. J. (2000) Archaeological fieldwork on Colonsay, computer modelling, experimental archaeology and final interpretations Cambridge: McDonald Institute for Archaeological Research, ©2000. 
Mithen, S. J. (2000) Hunter-gatherer landscape archaeology: the Southern Hebrides Mesolithic project, 1988-98 Cambridge: McDonald Institute for Archaeological Research, ©2000. 2 v. (Held in 50 libraries.)

Scholarly articles
Whitehead, P. G., Smith, S. J., Wade, A. J., Mithen, S. J., Finlayson, B., Sellwood, B. W. and Valdes, P. J. Modelling of hydrology and population levels at Bronze Age Jawa, Northern Jordan: a Monte Carlo approach to cope with uncertainty Journal of Archaeological Science. (in press)
Machin, A. J., Hosfield, R. T. and Mithen, S. J. (2005) Testing the functional utility of handaxe symmetry: fallow deer butchery with replica handaxes, Lithics: the Journal of the Lithic Studies Society, 26, 23-37.
Mithen, S. J. (2005) Ethnobiology and the evolution of the human mind Journal of the Royal Anthropological Institute, 12, 45-61.
Mithen, S. J., Finlayson, B. and Shaffrey, R. (2005) Sexual symbolism in the Early Neolithic of the southern Levant: pestles and mortars from WF16 Documenta Prahistorica, XXXII, 103-110.
Mithen, S. J. (2004) Neolithic beginnings in Western Asia and beyond. British Academy Review, 7, 45-49.
Mithen, S. J. (2004) The Mesolithic experience in Scotland in Mesolithic Scotland: The Early Holocene Prehistory of Scotland and its European Context (Ed. Saville, A.) Society of Antiquaries of Scotland, Edinburgh, pp. 243–260

Book chapters
Smith, S. J., Hughes, J. K. and Mithen, S. J. Explaining global patterns in Lower Palaeolithic technology: simulations of hominin dispersal and cultural transmission using 'Stepping Out' in Evolutionary Approaches to Cultural Behaviour (Ed. Shennan, S.) (in press)
Mithen, S. J. (2006) Overview and response to reviewers of The Singing Neanderthals Cambridge Archaeological Journal, 16, 97-112.*Mithen, S. J. (2006) The evolution of social information transmission in Homo in Social Information Transmission and Human Biology (Eds. Wells, J. C. K., Strickland, S. S. and Laland, K.) CRC Press, London, pp. 151–170
Mithen, S. J., Pirie, A. E. and Smith, S. (2006) Newly discovered chipped stone assemblages from Tiree. Discovery and Excavation in Scotland, 6, 22.
Mithen, S. J. (2004) ‘Stone Tools’, ‘Fire’, ‘Wooden Tools’, ‘Grinders & Polishers’, ‘Cereal Agriculture’, and the ‘Earliest Art’ in The Seventy Great Inventions of the Ancient World (Ed. Fagan, B.) Thames & Hudson, London, pp. 21–27, 32-33, 91-94, 215-219
Mithen, S. J. (2004) Contemporary Western art and archaeology in Substance, Memory, Display: archaeology and art (Eds. Renfrew, C., DeMarrais, E. and Gosden, C.) McDonald Institute for Archaeological Research, Cambridge, pp. 153–168
Mithen, S. J. (2004) From Ohalo to Çatalhöyük: the development of religiosity during the early prehistory of Western Asia, 20,000-7000 BC in Theorizing Religions Past (Eds. Whitehouse, H. and Martin, L. H.) AltaMira Press, Walnut Creek CA, pp. 17–43
Mithen, S. J. (2003) Handaxes: the first aesthetic artefacts in Evolutionary Aesthetics (Ed. Voland, E.) Springer-Verlag, Berlin, pp. 261–275

Book reviews
Mithen, S. J. (2008) Review of 'On Deep History and the Brain' by Daniel Lord Smail London Review of Books, 24 January 2008.
Mithen, S. J. (2006) Review of 'Before the Dawn: recovering the lost history of our ancestors' by Nicholas Wade New Scientist, 8 April.
Mithen, S. J. (2006) Review of 'Çatalhöyük: the Leopard's Tale. Revealing the mysteries of Turkey's ancient town' by Ian Hodder Times Higher Educational Supplement, 19 August.
Mithen, S. J. (2006) Review of 'The Archaeology of Warfare: prehistories of raiding and conquest', edited by Elizabeth Arkush and Mark Allen New Scientist, 22 July, 54-55.
Mithen, S. J. (2006) Review of 'The Metaphysics of Apes: negotiating the animal-human boundary' by Raymond Corby Cambridge Archaeological Journal, 16, 257-258.
Mithen, S. J. (2006) Review of 'The Quest for the Shaman' by M & S Aldhouse Green Times Higher Educational Supplement, 26 August.
Mithen, S. J. (2006) Review of 'Understanding Early Civilisations' by Bruce Trigger Journal of the Royal Anthropological Institute, 12, 683-684.
Mithen, S. J. (2003) Review of 'The Museum of the Mind' by J Mack New Scientist, 5 April 2003, 52.

Other publications
Machin, A. J., Hosfield, R. T. and Mithen, S. J. (2006) Quantifying the Functional Utility of Handaxe Symmetry: an experimental butchery approach ADS, York.
Mithen, S. J. (2003) Of ice and men Times Educational Supplement Teacher Magazine, 8-11.
Mithen, S. J. (2003) Stepping out: when and why did our forebears first disperse from their African home? Planet Earth NERC, 28-29.
Mithen, S. J. (2003) Thoroughly mobile minds New Scientist, 178, 40-41.
Mithen, S. J. (2003) Travels in time put flesh on forebears Times Higher Educational Supplement, 22-23.

References

External links
Staff Profile: Professor Steven Mithen
High notes of the singing Neanderthals
review of singing neanderthals

Neanderthals sang like sopranos
Audio recording of lecture (Communal and monumental architecture at the origin of the Neolithic in the Near East: new evidence from Wadi Faynan, Southern Jordan) given in the UCD Humanities Institute. February, 2011

Living people
British archaeologists
Human evolution theorists
Fellows of the British Academy
Academics of the University of Reading
British cognitive scientists
Prehistorians
People associated with The Institute for Cultural Research
Fellows of the Society of Antiquaries of London
Fellows of the Society of Antiquaries of Scotland
1960 births